The House of Menze or Menčetić was a noble family of the Republic of Ragusa in what is today Croatia.

Name
In the 15th century the surname was mostly spelt Mençe. The Slavic variant is Menčetić.

History
The family was said to come from Rome.

15th century
The family was ranked 9th of the 10 largest Ragusan houses.
The Menze inter-married mostly with the women from the Bona and Gondola family.

Notable members
Mateo Grube di Menze (d. 1381).
Johannes Blasius de Mençe (late 15th c.).
Orsolin Nicolin de Mençe ( 1421).
Šiško Menčetić (1457–1527)
Pietro Menze (Petar Menčetić, 1451–1508)
Placido Menze
Klement Marijan Domini Antun Menčetić, born in Dubrovnik, on 4 January 1747, son of Vlaho Klement Menčetić and Nika Getaldić.
Vlaho Antun Menčetić, son of Klement Đivo Menčetić and Marija Viktorija Kabužić, born in Dubrovnik, on 26 July 1729 and died 1778.

Sources

 

Ragusan noble families